RUMC (RCSI & UCD Malaysia Campus) is a private medical university in Penang, Malaysia. Established as Penang Medical College in 1996, RUMC is a Foreign University Branch Campus of the Royal College of Surgeons in Ireland and University College Dublin.

RUMC's undergraduate medicine programme is delivered in Ireland and Malaysia. It includes pre-clinical training of 2.5 years at either RCSI or UCD in Dublin, Ireland, followed by clinical training of 2.5 years in Penang where students undergo clinical rotations at Hospital Pulau Pinang, Hospital Seberang Jaya, Hospital Bukit Mertajam, and Hospital Taiping. The medical degree programme has one intake per year (every September). 

RUMC also offers a Foundation in Science (FIS) programme, a pre-university pathway to medicine with an intake every May/June. RUMC has graduated over 2,100 doctors. It is a coordinating site for Cochrane in Malaysia.

RUMC's interim president is Professor Dr. Patrick Felle.

Programmes

Undergraduate Medicine (MB BCh BAO) 
RUMC's flagship programme is the undergraduate medical degree. The intake for the programme is every September. The transnational programme is allows students to study in Dublin, Ireland and Penang, Malaysia. The degree is conferred by the National University of Ireland (NUI).

Pre-university programmes 
RUMC offers a Foundation in Science (FIS) programme, a pre-university pathway to medicine with an intake every May/June. The programme takes place in RUMC's campus in Penang, Malaysia for a duration of one year.

Other programmes 
RUMC hosts the Malaysia-Ireland Training Programme for Family Medicine (MInTFM), a specialty training for Family Medicine in collaboration with the Irish College of General Practitioners (ICGP). With four schemes available – Northern (Penang), Central (KL/Selangor), Southern (Johor), and East Malaysia (Sabah/Sarawak), the 4-year training programme is open to both permanent and contract Medical Officers employed under the Ministry of Health, Malaysia.

References

External links
 

Educational institutions established in 1996
Medical schools in Malaysia
Colleges in Malaysia
Buildings and structures in George Town, Penang